The 2022 Colgate Raiders football team represented Colgate University as a member of the Patriot League during the 2022 NCAA Division I FCS football season. The Raiders, led by second-year head coach Stan Dakosty, played their home games at Crown Field at Andy Kerr Stadium.

Previous season

The Raiders finished the 2021 season with a record of 5–6, 5–1 Patriot League play to finish in second place.

Schedule

Game Summaries

at Stanford

at Maine

at Penn

No. 13 Holy Cross

Cornell

at Army

Georgetown

at Bucknell

Lafayette

at Lehigh

at No. 21т Fordham

References

Colgate
Colgate Raiders football seasons
Colgate Raiders football